Something Stupid or variants may refer to:

Something Stupid (TV series), Australian comedy show aired in 1998 
"Somethin' Stupid", also "Something Stupid", a song written by Carson Parks, sung by Frank Sinatra
"Something Stupid", a song by Shawn Desman from the 2010 album Fresh
Something Stupid, an EP by Edgar Mortiz & Vilma Santos, won at the 1971 3rd Awit Awards
 "Something Stupid" (Better Call Saul), the title of the seventh episode of the fourth season of the television show Better Call Saul